Speed of Flight is an original novel written by Paul Leonard and based on the long-running British science fiction television series Doctor Who. It features the Third Doctor, Jo and Mike Yates.

Plot
The TARDIS lands on Nooma, a world in the midst of an industrial revolution. But the Doctor, Jo and Mike Yates quickly discover more: The sky is at war with the ground, with continents moving and somewhere, a starship has a role to play. Mike finds himself in a life or death fight, Jo is caught in a laborers' rebellion, and the Doctor must uncover what is happening to Nooma before the struggle for survival destroys all...

Continuity
The story takes place after the Missing Adventure Dancing the Code, also by Paul Leonard.

This storyline is a technical prequel to the Sixth Doctor story "Timelash", as the Doctor is intending to take Jo and Mike to the planet Karfel although he never reaches it in this novel; "Timelash" made it clear that the Third Doctor had visited Karfel at some unrecorded point with Jo Grant and an unidentified second companion.

References

External links
The Cloister Library - Speed of Flight

1996 British novels
1996 science fiction novels
Virgin Missing Adventures
Third Doctor novels
British science fiction novels
Novels by Paul Leonard